KhAD FC is a Mongolian football club, competing in the Mongolian First League.

Squad 2019

References

Football clubs in Mongolia